Colter may refer to:

 Colter Butte, a summit in the Grand Canyon
 Colter's Hell, a thermal area at the mouth of the Shoshone's canyon in Wyoming
 Colter Peak, a mountain peak in Yellowstone National Park

People 
 Colter Bean (born 1977), American baseball pitcher
 Fred Colter (1879–1944), Arizona politician
 Jessi Colter (born 1943), American country music singer
 John Colter (1774–1813), American trapper
 Mary Colter (1869–1958), American architect
 Mike Colter (born 1976), American actor
 Zeb Colter (born 1949), ring name of American professional wrestler Wayne Keown

See also
 Coulter (disambiguation)